Dennis the Menace (known as Dennis in Europe) is a platform game adaptation of the 1993 film of the same name which itself is based on the Dennis the Menace comic strip. It was released for the Game Boy, Super Nintendo Entertainment System, and Amiga. The object of the game is to defeat a burglar who managed to find Dennis'  town via the local railroad connection. Stages include Mr. Wilson's house, the great outdoors, a boiler room, and eventually a boss battle with the burglar.

Plot
Dennis Mitchell has to rescue his friends Joey and Margaret, along with Mr. Wilson's coin collection, from the burglar Switchblade Sam.

Gameplay
Controlling Dennis Mitchell, the player has to go through four stages, collecting five large coins in each one. If the player manages to find both of Dennis's friends along with Mr. Wilson's entire coin collection, he will have won the game.

Health is represented by hearts. If Dennis is touched by an enemy, one heart will disappear, and Dennis is temporarily stunned. Once all of the hearts are gone, the player must restart the level (but retains all main coins found). Pieces of candy located throughout the levels fully restore Dennis' health when collected.

The player has 999 seconds (16.7 minutes) to complete each stage. If time runs out, there is an immediate game over, which completely eradicates all work done on a level. The clock is not reset when Dennis loses a life.

Reception

Electronic Gaming Monthly gave the Super NES version a 5.6 out of 10, remarking that "the game is somewhat unappealing, with a main character that just doesn't come to life." Super Gamer gave an overall score of 74% writing: "An extremely pretty and challenging game, although gameplay is rather fiddly and slow."

References

1993 video games
Amiga games
Amiga 1200 games
Dennis the Menace (U.S. comics)
Game Boy games
Ocean Software games
Platform games
Super Nintendo Entertainment System games
Video games about children
Video games based on films
Video games based on adaptations
Video games developed in the United Kingdom